Tambe is a surname. Notable people with the surname include:

Bhaskar Ramchandra Tambe (1873–1941), Indian Marathi poet
Milind Tambe (born 1965), Indian professor
Pravin Tambe (born 1971), Indian cricketer
S. B. Tambe, Indian politician
Y. S. Tambe (1904–?), Indian jurist